Minskip is a village in the Harrogate district of North Yorkshire, England. It forms part of the civil parish of Boroughbridge. It is on the A6055 road and 1 mile south-west of Boroughbridge. Minskip appears in the Domesday Book as Minescip, a name derived from the Old English gemaenscipe meaning a community or communal holding.

Administration
Minskip was historically a township in the parish of Aldborough in the West Riding of Yorkshire.  It became a separate civil parish in 1866, but in 1938 the civil parish was abolished and merged into the civil parish of Boroughbridge.  In 1974 Minskip was transferred from the West Riding to the new county of North Yorkshire.

Transport
Bus links are provided by Eddie Brown.  The village is very close to the A1(M).

References

External links

Villages in North Yorkshire
Former civil parishes in North Yorkshire